Govi may refer to:

 Govi-Altai Province, province of Mongolia
 Govi-Ugtaal, district of Dundgovi Province in central Mongolia

Persons 

 Govi (musician), new age/ambient Hawaiian-German musician
 Anselmo Govi, Italian painter and decorator
 Gilberto Govi, Italian actor
 Sergio Adolfo Govi, Italian Roman Catholic bishop